Emir Kenzhegazyuly Baigazin (Emir Kenjeğazyūly Baiğazin; born 19 July 1984) is a Kazakh actor and film director, active in the genres of auteur cinema and art-house.

Emir Kenzhegazyuly Baigazin was born on 19 July 1984 in Tamdy village, Alga District in the Aktobe Province of Kazakh SSR (USSR).

After graduating from high school in Alga (from 2002 to 2004), he studied at the acting school of the T. Akhtanov Aktobe Drama Theater and in 2004 he entered the Kazakh National Academy of Arts, where he specialised in film direction and cinema.

In September 2007, he participated in the Busan International Film Festival, the Asian Film Academy (AFA). In February 2008, he was a member of the Berlin camp of young talent at the 58th Berlin International Film Festival in Germany.

Filmography
 Day Watch (2005) — young Tamerlan.

Short films:
 Cheerful and Offended (2006) — screenwriter, director and cameraman.
 Steppe (2007) — screenwriter, director and cameraman.
 Virgins (2007) — screenwriter and director.
 Весогонщик (2008) — screenwriter and director.
 Silhouettes of Almaty (2007) — producer.

Feature films:
 Harmony Lessons is a 2013 Kazakh-German coproduction. It won Baigazin the World Cinema Fund prize at the Berlin International Film Festival, Tengrinews, Jan 18 2013</ref> and was shown at the Tribeca Film Festival. He was nominated for the Asia Pacific Screen Award for Achievement in Directing for this film.
 The Wounded Angel (2016) premiered at the 66th Berlinale (Panorama Special). The film is a Kazakh-French-German co-production with the support of ARTE.
 The River (2018)
 Life (2022)

References

1984 births
Living people
Kazakhstani male actors
Kazakhstani film directors